Air Ways was an Australian factual television series broadcast on the Seven Network, narrated by Corinne Grant and produced by Lyndal Marks, the executive producer in charge of Border Security. It began screening in July 2009 and was filmed in airports including Melbourne, Coolangatta, Rockhampton, Mackay, Adelaide, Launceston, Hobart and Alice Springs.

Air Ways followed the day-to-day operations of budget airline Tigerair Australia. It had a similar premise to the successful UK factual television series Airline.

Air Ways returned for a second s

Reception

Ratings
Air Ways had a strong debut, attracting an audience of 1.216 million for its first episode. Subsequent episodes have been watched by over 1.3 million viewers a week. On 25 August 2009 it was the second most popular show of the day.

Air Ways was ranked 7th in the top 15 shows for the week ending 25 July 2009 and 13th for the week ending 1 August 2009.

Season 2 of Air Ways also had a strong debut in a new Sunday evening time slot, ending up being the fourth most popular show of the night. The show continued to improve, moving to the number one position for several weeks running. Note that the final episode was in fact a repeat of a season one episode, perhaps explaining the sudden ratings slip.

Reviews
TV Tonight, an Australian television blog, rated Airways three stars out of five, saying that this format "makes for tasty voyeurism" and that "it will be very entertaining to those who eat up this genre".

See also
Airline (1998 TV series)

References

External links
Official site – Yahoo!7

2009 Australian television series debuts
2012 Australian television series endings
Australian factual television series
Documentary television series about aviation
Seven Network original programming